The 1924 Nevada Wolf Pack football team was an American football team that represented the University of Nevada as an independent during the 1924 college football season. In their first and only season under head coach Charles F. Erb, the team compiled a 3–4–1 record.

Erb was hired as the team's head coach in late April 1924. He was captain of the 1921 California Golden Bears football team. Erb resigned as Nevada's head coach on January 9, 1925.

Bill Gutteron played quarterback for the Wolf Pack from 1923 to 1925. He later played quarterback in the National Football League (NFL) for the Los Angeles Buccaneers.

Schedule

References

Nevada
Nevada Wolf Pack football seasons
Nevada Wolf Pack football